Central Collegiate is a high school in Moose Jaw, Saskatchewan, Canada. It has approximately 520 students and 40 staff and is currently one of the oldest operating public schools in Saskatchewan. Central originally opened its doors in 1910.

Central is a progressive and diverse school. It offers a wide variety of courses in various disciplines: business, technology, fine arts, math, sciences, applied arts, wellness, humanities, and languages. There is also an English as a second language program for many Moose Jaw residents.

External links
School website

High schools in Saskatchewan
Educational institutions established in 1909
Buildings and structures in Moose Jaw
1909 establishments in Saskatchewan